Tore Nilsen (28 October 1933 – 13 May 2018) was a Norwegian footballer. He played in five matches for the Norway national football team from 1956 to 1958.

References

External links
 

1933 births
2018 deaths
Norwegian footballers
Norway international footballers
Place of birth missing
Association footballers not categorized by position